The 1969 New York state election was held on November 4, 1969, to elect a judge of the New York Court of Appeals.

Background
On May 20, 1969, Judge Kenneth B. Keating resigned, and was appointed U.S. Ambassador to India.

Nominations
On August 30, Governor Nelson A. Rockefeller recommended to the Republican State Committee the nomination of the Presiding Justice of the Appellate Division (Third Dept.) James Gibson for the Court of Appeals.

On September 4, Gibson was nominated by the Republican, Democratic and Conservative state committees. The Liberal Party refused to endorse Gibson or any other candidate. 

On September 15, Governor Rockefeller appointed Gibson to fill the vacancy temporarily.

Result
The incumbent Gibson was re-elected.

Notes

See also
New York state elections
New York City mayoral election, 1969

1969
1969
 
New York